Arkansas Highway 200 (AR 200, Ark. 200, and Hwy. 200) is the designation for a state highway in the U.S. state of Arkansas. The route is split into two sections, both of which are in southwest Arkansas. The first section begins at US 278 and US 371 in Rosston and ends at AR 299 at the unincorporated community of Morris. The second section begins at US 371 on the west end of Prescott and ends at AR 19 on the north end of Prescott. Both sections are located entirely within Nevada county and are maintained by the Arkansas Department of Transportation (ARDOT).

Route description

Section 1 

The first and longest section begins at US 278 and US 371 in Rosston. The route heads east, then turns north and enters the small community of Cale, serving as the primary access road for the community.

Section 2 

The second section begins at US 371 on the west end of Prescott. The route then heads in a northeastern direction for about  before reaching its eastern terminus at AR 19 on the north end of Prescott. The route parallels Interstate 30 for its entire length and does not intersects any other signed highways or communities.

Major intersections

References

200
Transportation in Nevada County, Arkansas